Maben is an unincorporated community in Wyoming County, West Virginia, United States, along the Slab Fork and West Virginia Route 54. The community is home to Integrated Resources of Wyoming County as well as the counties only 7 Eleven.

The community was named after John C. Maben, the original owner of the town site.

References

Unincorporated communities in West Virginia
Unincorporated communities in Wyoming County, West Virginia
Coal towns in West Virginia